Herbert Gustave Schmalz, known as Herbert Carmichael after 1918 (1 June 1856, Newcastle – 24 November 1935, London) was an English painter.

Life
Schmalz was born in England to the German Consul, Gustave Schmalz, and his English wife, Margaret Carmichael; eldest daughter of the painter, James Wilson Carmichael. He received a conventional education in painting, first at the South Kensington Art School and later at the Royal Academy of Arts, where he studied with Frank Dicksee, Stanhope Forbes and Arthur Hacker. He perfected his studies in Antwerp at the Royal Academy of Fine Arts.

After his return to London he made a name for himself as a history painter, with a style influenced by the Pre-Raphaelites and orientalism. In 1884 he successfully exhibited his painting Too Late at the Royal Academy. After a voyage to Jerusalem in 1890 he made a series of paintings with New Testament topics, with Return from Calvary (1891) one of the best known.

After 1895 Schmalz increasingly painted portraits. In 1900 he held a big solo exhibition named "A Dream of Fair Women" in the Fine Art Society in Bond Street.

Schmalz was friends with William Holman Hunt, Val Prinsep and Frederic Leighton. In 1918, after Germany was defeated in World War I, he adopted his mother's maiden name.

Other selected paintings

Further reading
Trevor Blakemore, The art of Herbert Schmalz: with monographs on certain pictures by various writers, and 64 illustrations (London: 1911)

References

External links

1856 births
1935 deaths
19th-century English painters
20th-century English painters
Alumni of the Royal College of Art
English people of German descent
English male painters
Orientalist painters
People from Ryton, Tyne and Wear
20th-century English male artists
19th-century English male artists